The Shannons V8 Touring Car National Series was an Australian touring car series held for V8 Supercars. It was the inaugural running of the V8 Touring Car National Series, a third-tier series for V8 Supercars. The season began on 17 May 2008 at the Mallala Motor Sport Park and finished on 30 November at Sandown Raceway. The season consisted of four rounds, held across three different states.

The series was won by Chris Smerdon who was the only driver to finish all twelve races, but also won eight races. He finished 130 points ahead of Steve Ingwersen who was the only other driver to attend all four rounds.

Teams and drivers
The following teams and drivers have competed during the 2008 Shannons V8 Touring Car National Series.

Race calendar

Results and standings
The season consisted of four rounds held across three different states. Each round consisted of three races.

Drivers championship

References

See also
 2008 V8 Supercar season

Shannons
V8 Touring Car Series